Diane Andrews McGuire (born December 1, 1952, in Brockton, Massachusetts) is an American writer of mystery short stories. Her works have been published in the magazines Alfred Hitchcock's Mystery Magazine and Ellery Queen's Mystery Magazine.

In 1994 she won the Robert L. Fish Memorial Award from the Mystery Writers of America for her debut short story "Wicked Twist" (AHMM, November 1993).

References 

Writers from Brockton, Massachusetts
1952 births
American mystery writers
American short story writers
Living people
American women novelists
Women mystery writers
Novelists from Massachusetts
21st-century American women